A sponge grenade is a riot control weapon, intended to be non-lethal, which is fired from a 40 mm grenade launcher to cause confusion, or otherwise temporarily disable its target.  As a single blunt force object, it is best used when aimed at a particular individual.

The projectile weighs about 28 grams (1 ounce). It is bullet-shaped, with a foam rubber nose and a high-density, plastic projectile body.

Potential for injury or death
Proper use of the weapons involves firing it from a medium distance, and aiming for the legs or lower torso. Firing it too close, or firing it too far away which decreases the ability to accurately aim for the legs or lower torso, can cause serious injury.

Improper use of sponge grenades can cause broken bones, head wounds, or permanent damage to eyes. Sponge grenades impacting the upper body or head have killed targeted individuals.

Use around the world

Israel

Israel has deployed sponge grenades against Palestinian protesters on several occasions.

Hong Kong

The Hong Kong Police Force has deployed sponge grenades as a riot control tool on several occasions in July 2019 during the anti-extradition protests.

New Zealand

During the fourth week of the 2022 Wellington protests against COVID-19 pandemic control measures, the New Zealand Police deployed sponge grenades as one of the many tools used in their effort to clear the parliamentary grounds of rioters.

United States
Sponge grenades were used by some police departments during the George Floyd protests in the summer of 2020 and were cited as being one of the most common types of less-lethal rounds employed,. In some cases, protesters were struck in the head or face by the rounds, causing serious injury.

See also
 Baton round

References

External links
 More data and a picture from the website of the Federation of American Scientists

Baton rounds
Non-lethal projectiles
Paramilitary cartridges